SLZ, slz or variation, may refer to:

Places
 San Lawrenz (postal code SLZ), Malta
 Solari railway station (station code SLZ), Khordha, Odisha, India
 Marechal Cunha Machado International Airport (IATA airport code SLZ), São Luís, Maranhão, Brazil
 San Lorenzo High School (SLz), Ashland, California, USA
 San Lorenzo Unified School District (SLz USD), Ashland, California, USA

Other uses
 Scholzite	(mineral code Slz), see List of mineral symbols
 Ma'ya language (ISO 639 code slz)
 SLZ Group, a Swiss financial services company
 Super Luza (ICAO airline code SLZ), an Angolan airline; see List of airline codes (S)
 Schweizerische Lehrerzeitung (SLZ), a Swiss newspaper published by Conzett & Huber (publishing house)

See also

 San Lorenzo (sLz), Spanish for Saint Lawrence
 São Luiz (sLz), Portuguese for Saint Louis